Alexis-Jean-Marie Guilloux (born 1819 in Ploërmel) was a French clergyman and bishop for the Roman Catholic Archdiocese of Port-au-Prince. He was ordained in 1848. He was appointed bishop in 1870. He died in 1885.

References 

1819 births
1885 deaths
French Roman Catholic bishops
People from Ploërmel
Roman Catholic archbishops of Port-au-Prince